Mandalselva or Mandalsåni or Marna (English: Mandal River) is a river in Agder county in Norway. The river has its origins in the mountains between Ose in Setesdal and the Upper Sirdal valley. The river flows south to its mouth at the North Sea at the town of Mandal. The largest tributaries are Monn, Logna, Skjerka, Kosåna, Logåna, and Røyselandsbekken. Skjerka, Monn and Logna all flow into the lake Øre in Åseral which is considered the beginning of the main Mandalselva river. The river passes through the villages of Kylland, Bjelland, Laudal, Heddeland, Øyslebø, and Krossen.

Hydropower development 
Hydropower development of the river on a larger scale started in 1930. At present there are six power plants along the river and its upper tributaries: Logna, Smeland, Skjerka, Håverstad, Bjelland, and Laudal.

During flooding periods in the spring and autumn, water flow can be far greater.

Salmon and trout 
The original salmon stocks are extinct as a result of acid rain, but extensive liming has led to a better environment in the river, and a new salmon stocks are established. It was caught  of salmon and sea trout in Mandalselva in 2015.

Media gallery

References

External links 
 Mandalselva in Norwegian
 Salmon fishing in Mandalselva 

Rivers of Agder
Åseral
Lyngdal
Lindesnes
Rivers of Norway